William John Beattie (born 21 September 1942) is a former minister of religion and Unionist politician in Northern Ireland.

Beattie grew up in Ballymena. In 1965, he became a student minister at the Dunmurry Free Presbyterian Church, and in 1967 he became a full minister in the Church, led by Ian Paisley. He also joined Paisley's Protestant Unionist Party (PUP), and became the deputy leader. Beattie first came to public attention in 1966 after he took over Paisley's Ulster Hall rallies while he was imprisoned for unlawful assembly.

In 1970, Beattie was elected to the Northern Ireland House of Commons in a by-election in South Antrim. Beattie had stood in the same constituency in the previous year's election but failed to be elected. On the same day, Paisley was elected for Bannside, and the two became the PUP's first Members of Parliament. Journalist W. D. Flackes later commented that these by-elections were "probably the most vital in the history of the Stormont House of Commons".

Beattie stood for Belfast North in the 1970 general election, but came a distant third, behind the Official Unionist Party (OUP) and Labour candidates.

In 1971, the PUP formed the Democratic Unionist Party (DUP), and Beattie retained his post as deputy leader.  The Parliament was prorogued in 1972, but Beattie was elected to the Northern Ireland Assembly of 1973, and became deputy chief whip of the United Unionist Assembly Party (UUUC). He was again elected, to the Northern Ireland Constitutional Convention in 1975. However, 1975 saw the beginning of Beattie's fall from Paisley's favour. He seriously damaged his political credibility within hard-line unionism, when, as a member of the three-man UUUC delegation which held talks with the Social Democratic and Labour Party (SDLP), he failed to dissociate himself early enough from Bill Craig's suggestion of having Northern Ireland governed by a voluntary coalition between unionists and nationalists. In early 1976 Beattie was replaced as chairman of the DUP.

Beattie had a reputation for provocative rhetoric; several times he had warned the SDLP not to provoke a "civil war situation or they and their supporters will have to seek refuge in the Republic", had accused the 1976 peace women of concentrating their efforts "where they would not interfere with terrorist activity"; and had suggested that only "the gallows would bring peace to Ulster".

Beattie was elected to Lisburn District Council in 1977, becoming one of the last people to be elected in the whole of Northern Ireland. Beattie's election to the council began what one fellow councillor called "A period of bigoted sectarian confrontations after four years in which Lisburn had a relatively good and moderate reputation". The most infamous clash was the Beattie-led loyalist protest over the building of a new overflow Catholic housing estate at Poleglass on the edge of West Belfast. From his base at Dunmurry, adjacent the proposed scheme, Beattie claimed that 30,000 loyalists were prepared to "fight to the bitter end" to stop the new homes for Catholics, and threatened to sabotage the Housing Executive's allocation of homes to Catholics by setting up "Protestant-only estates". Beattie's campaign was ultimately unsuccessful, aside from one low-key rally addressed by DUP leader Ian Paisley and Official Unionist leader Jim Molyneaux.

In April 1983 Beattie forced the cancellation of Sunday performances by Circus Hoffman by threatening to disrupt them with open-air prayer meetings outside. He also agitated to reinstate a ban on usage of the municipal swimming pool and other public leisure facilities on Sundays. One anti-Catholic outburst from Beattie so embarrassed an Official Unionist member of Lisburn Council that he personally apologised to an SDLP member present. Beattie also objected to library facilities for the predominantly Catholic Twinbrook estate and to planning permission for a health centre in Poleglass.

Peter Robinson later replaced Beattie as DUP Deputy Leader and Alan Kane as Press Secretary.

In May 1982 the Irish National Liberation Army (INLA) attempted to assassinate Beattie by planting a large bomb at his home. The device failed to detonate and was defused by the British Army.

Beattie was elected to the Northern Ireland Assembly of 1982. Months after being elected, Beattie came to media attention after attempting to stop the Assembly's economic development committee from discussing a proposal from Londonderry Chamber of Commerce for a cross-border industrial development zone in Derry and Donegal.

Beattie stood in Lagan Valley in the 1983 general election, but again failed to win a seat in the British House of Commons. He resigned from the DUP in the mid-1990s, and retired as a minister on 31 December 2005.

Writing in Fortnight magazine in 1983, journalist Andy Pollak described Beattie as "one of the last truly unashamed voices of Northern Irish bigotry".

References

Northern Ireland Parliamentary Results: Biographies
Lisburn Free Presbyterian Churches

1942 births
Living people
Members of Lisburn City Council
Democratic Unionist Party members of the House of Commons of Northern Ireland
Members of the Northern Ireland Assembly 1973–1974
Members of the House of Commons of Northern Ireland 1969–1973
Members of the Northern Ireland Constitutional Convention
Northern Ireland MPAs 1982–1986
Free Presbyterian Church of Ulster ministers
Members of the House of Commons of Northern Ireland for County Antrim constituencies
People from Ballymena
Politicians from County Antrim